Klear is a social media analytics and intelligence platform.

Klear was founded in 2011 by three brothers, Eytan Avigdor, Guy Avigdor and Noam Avigdor. The company was initially named Twtrland and offered an analytics tool for Twitter. 

In June 2015, the company announced raising $1.5M from Altair, GIG and TMT and its rebranding as Klear.

Klear provides a database of 200 million social media profiles. The profiles are sorted into 60,000 interests and categories.

References

External links 
Klear home page

Social media companies
Social media management platforms